Songs the Dead Men Sing is the fourth short story collection of author George R.R. Martin. It was first published in October 1983 by Dark Harvest. It contains nine short stories.

Contents

References 

Short story collections by George R. R. Martin
1983 short story collections